The 13th Wisconsin Infantry Regiment was an infantry regiment that served in the Union Army during the American Civil War.

Service
The 13th Wisconsin was raised at Janesville, Wisconsin, and mustered into federal service October 17, 1861.

The regiment was mustered out on November 24, 1865, at San Antonio, Texas.

Casualties

The 13th Wisconsin  suffered 5 enlisted men killed in action or who later died of their wounds, plus another 188 enlisted men who died of disease, for a total of 193 fatalities.

Colonels
 Colonel Maurice Maloney (October 15, 1861August 1, 1862) was a U.S. Army captain in the 4th U.S. Infantry and retired in August 1862.
 Colonel William P. Lyon (August 6, 1862November 24, 1865) began the war as captain of Co. K in the 8th Wisconsin Infantry Regiment.  He received an honorary brevet to brigadier general at the end of the war.  After the war he became the 12th speaker of the Wisconsin State Assembly and the 7th chief justice of the Wisconsin Supreme Court.

Notable members
 Ira Barnes Dutton, also known as Joseph Dutton, was quartermaster sergeant and was later commissioned 2nd lieutenant and promoted to 1st lieutenant in Co. I, finally promoted to quartermaster near the end of the war.  After the war he became a Catholic missionary in Hawaii, ministering to the leper colony on Molokai until his death.  He is a candidate for sainthood.
 John M. Evans was the regiment surgeon.  After the war he served as a Wisconsin legislator and was the first mayor of Evansville, Wisconsin.
 Edward Lee Greene was a private in Co. K.  After the war he wrote an extensive botanical record of the plant species of the American west.
 Simon Lord was the 2nd assistant surgeon until 1863, when he was promoted out of the regiment to become surgeon of the 32nd Wisconsin Infantry Regiment.  After the war he served as a Wisconsin state senator.
 Frederick F. Norcross, brother of Pliny Norcross, was a corporal in Co. K and died of disease at Nashville, in May 1865.
 Lanson P. Norcross, brother of Pliny Norcross, was a private in Co. K and served through the whole war with the regiment.
 Pliny Norcross was captain of Co. K for three years.  Earlier in the war, he served as a corporal in Co. K of the 1st Wisconsin Infantry Regiment.  After the war he became a Wisconsin state legislator and the 20th mayor of Janesville, Wisconsin.
 Archibald N. Randall was captain of Co. G.  After the war he became a Wisconsin state senator.
 Hezekiah C. Tilton was chaplain of the regiment.  After the war he served as a Wisconsin legislator.
 Edwin E. Woodman was captain of Co. B, but was detailed for much of the war as an engineering aide on the brigade and division staff.  After the war he served as a Wisconsin state senator.

See also

 List of Wisconsin Civil War units
 Wisconsin in the American Civil War

Notes

References
The Civil War Archive

Military units and formations established in 1861
Military units and formations disestablished in 1865
Units and formations of the Union Army from Wisconsin
1861 establishments in Wisconsin